Vannes is a commune in the Morbihan department in Brittany in north-western France. It was founded over 2,000 years ago.

History

Celtic Era

The name Vannes comes from the Veneti, a seafaring Celtic people who lived in the south-western part of Armorica in Gaul before the Roman invasions. The region seems to have been involved in a cross channel trade for thousands of years, probably using hide boats and perhaps Ferriby Boats. Wheat that apparently was grown in the Middle East was part of this trade. At about 150 BC the evidence of trade (such as Gallo-Belgic coins) with the Thames estuary area of Great Britain dramatically increased.

Roman Era
The Veneti were defeated by Julius Caesar's fleet in 56 BC in front of Locmariaquer; many of the Veneti were then either slaughtered or sold into slavery. The Romans settled a town called Darioritum in a location previously belonging to the Veneti.

The Britons arrive
From the 5th to the 7th century, the remaining Gauls were displaced or assimilated by waves of immigrant Britons fleeing the Saxon invasions of Britain. Under the Breton name Gwened (also derived from the Veneti), the town was the center of an independent principality or kingdom variously called Bro-Wened ("Vannes") or Bro-Ereg ("land of Gwereg"), the latter for a prominent member of its dynasty, which claimed descent from Caradog Strongarm. The diocese of Vannes was erected in the 5th century. The Council of Vannes was held there in 461. The realm annexed Cornouaille for a time in the early 6th century but was permanently joined with Domnonia under its king and Saint Judicaël around 635.

Breton War of Succession
In 1342, Vannes was besieged four times between forces from both sides of the Breton War of Succession. The city's defending commander, Olivier IV de Clisson, was captured by the English but finally released. The French eventually executed him since they suspected him of being a traitor since the ransom was unusually low.

18th century
In 1759, Vannes was used as the staging point for a planned French invasion of Britain. A large army was assembled there, but it was never able to sail after the French naval defeat at the Battle of Quiberon Bay in November 1759.

In 1795, during the French Revolution, French forces based in Vannes successfully repelled a planned British-Royalist invasion through Quiberon.

Geography
Vannes is a market town linked to the sea.

Climate

Transport

Train
The Vannes railway station offers connections to Quimper, Rennes, Nantes, Paris and several regional destinations.
With the fast train TGV, the journey takes:
– 30 minutes to Lorient,
– 1 hour to Nantes or Rennes,
– 2.5 to 4 hours to Paris.
The Transport express régional or TER is a slower train to join railway stations in the close neighborhood, such as Auray or Questembert.
There is no direct line from Vannes to Saint-Brieuc (118 km away in the north of Brittany), so the train from Vannes to Saint Brieuc goes via Rennes, which doubles the travel time and cost: it takes 2 to 3 hours to go from Vannes to Saint Brieuc by train.

Car
Two highways, in the north of Vannes, provide fast connections by car:
– N165: west to Lorient (58 km) and Quimper (122 km), south east to Nantes (111 km)
– N166: north east to Rennes (113 km)
+ a network of small roads connects Vannes to smaller cities.
There is no highway from Vannes to Saint-Brieuc, so the way to northern Brittany consists of small roads. The lack of highway or railway between Vannes and Saint-Brieuc (118 km north) cuts the communications between northern and southern Brittany, and limits Brittany economic performance.

Airplanes
Vannes has a small airfield in the village of Monterblanc, called Vannes-Meucon airport, or "Vannes – Golfe du Morbihan airport". It used to be a military airport, but it is now dedicated to general aviation aircraft. It belongs to Vannes Agglomeration community, the group of cities gathered around Vannes, and the main users of this airfield are Vannes flying club, the local ultralight aviation club, and Vannes school of skydiving.

Bus
There are 2 bus networks in Vannes:
– Kicéo, proposes short travels starting from Vannes Place de la Republique on behalf of Vannes Agglomeration community,
– CAT, propose longer travel starting from the railway station on behalf of Morbihan.
So there are 2 central bus stations in Vannes: one on Place de la Libération, the other at the railway station.

Bike
Vannes has a public bicycle rental program, called Vélocéo based on the same idea as the Paris Vélib'.
Hundreds of bicycles are available across 10 automated rental stations each with 10 to fifteen bikes/spaces.
Each Vélocéo service station is equipped with an automatic rental terminal and stands for bicycles.
This replaces the Velocea service, which was discontinued in August 2017.

Population
Inhabitants of Vannes are called Vannetais.

Monuments and sights

 Cathedral of St Peter, Gothic cathedral
 Church of St Patern, classic church
 Chapel of Saint-Yves, baroque church
 Château Gaillard (medieval house now used as an archaeological museum)
 Musée de la Cohue (fine arts museum)
 Hôtel de Ville
 Old city walls, which include :
 Tour du Connétable (a large medieval tower part of the old city walls)
 Château de l'Hermine (former castle, transformed into a palace in the 17th century, and a residence of the Dukes of Brittany between the 13th and 16th centuries)
 Porte Calmont, medieval city gate
 Porte Prison, medieval city gate
 Porte Poterne, medieval city gate
 Porte Saint-Jean, medieval city gate
 Porte Saint-Vincent, 18th century city gate
 Many timber-framed houses in the old town
 "Vannes and his wife", a funny painted granite sculpture from the 15th century in front of Château Gaillard
 The harbour

Education 
 École nationale supérieure d'ingénieurs de Bretagne Sud
 Institut catholique d'arts et métiers
 Southern Brittany University

Breton language
The municipality launched a linguistic plan through Ya d'ar brezhoneg on 12 October 2007. In 2008, 7.71% of children attended the bilingual schools in primary education.

In fiction
 In the last of the Three Musketeers novels of Alexandre Dumas, The Vicomte of Bragelonne: Ten Years Later, published in 1847, the musketeer Aramis appears as bishop of Vannes before becoming General of the Society of Jesus.
 In Sébastien Roch, a novel by Octave Mirbeau published in 1890, Sebastien is sent to a school in Vannes, Saint-François-Xavier, where he is a victim of sexual abuse.
 In Sir Nigel, a novel by Sir Arthur Conan Doyle published in 1906, Nigel is made seneschal of the Castle of Vannes after a battle in Brittany. He doesn't remain in Vannes, since after winning in another battle, the Black Prince dubs him a knight and Nigel returns to England to wed the Lady Mary.
 Jean-François Parot has written a series of crime fictions printed up to 2010 taking place in the 18th century, whose main character is Nicolas Le Floch, a Police Commissioner who was also educated in the school of Saint François-Xavier in Vannes, but he didn't share Sebastien Roch's misfortune. The Nicolas Le Floch novels have been adapted as a television series.
 In The Secret of the Missing Boat, a children's book by Paul Berna published in 1966 as La Voile Rouge.
 In "Charlemagne and Florent," a short story by Ranylt Richildis published in 2014 by Myths Inscribed.
 Vannes is a major location in C.J. Adrien's novel The Oath of the Father, published in 2015, about the Viking raids in Brittany.

Notable people
Albinus of Angers (born 469), Roman Catholic saint
Saint Emilion (Emilianus) (?–767), monk and Roman Catholic saint, he gave his name to one of the main red wine areas of Bordeaux
François I (1414–1450), Duke of Brittany
Louis-Marie Autissier (1772–1830), painter
Armand Alexandre de Castagny (1807–1900), military general
Louise Bourgoin (born 1981), actress
Pierre de La Gorce (1846–1934), historian
Paul César Helleu (1859–1927), painter
Émile Jourdan (1860–1931), painter of Pont-Aven School
Louis Martin-Chauffier (1894–1980), writer, journalist and member of the French Resistance
Yves Rocard (1903–1992), physicist
Colonel Rémy (1904–1984), secret agent of the French Resistance
Alain Resnais (1922–2014), film director
Jean Vezin (1933–2020), palaeographer
Yves Coppens (born 1934), paleontologist
Serge Latouche (born 1940), economist
Cédric Morgan (born 1943), writer, winner of the Prix Breizh in 2015
Claude-Michel Schönberg (born 1944), singer and songwriter
Bernard Poignant (born 1945), politician
Hélène de Fougerolles (born 1973), actress
Mathieu Berson (born 1980), footballer
Joris Marveaux (born 1982), footballer
Sylvain Marveaux (born 1986), footballer
Yann Kermorgant (born 1981), footballer
Jeremy Callaghan, Australian actor and writer

Sport
The local football team is Vannes OC, members of the Championnat de France de Ligue 2 for the 2009–10 season.

The Rugby Club Vannes is the rugby union team and competed in Pro D2 for the 2015–16 season.

Both teams play at the Stade de la Rabine built in 2001.

The town was the start line for stage 9 of the 2015 Tour de France.

Twin towns – sister cities

Vannes is twinned with:
 Mons, Belgium (1952)
 Cuxhaven, Germany (1963)
 Fareham, England, United Kingdom (1967)
 Wałbrzych, Poland (2001)
 Ballymoney, Northern Ireland, United Kingdom (2001)

See also
 Saint-Vincent Gate (Vannes)
 Veneti (Gaul)
 Saint Meriasek
 Operation Dingson
 Communes of the Morbihan department
 Pierre Marie François Ogé Sculpture in Vannes town hall.
 Eleanor, a Nile crocodile resident of the Aquarium du Vannes.

Gallery

References

External links

 Official web site of the city
 
 

 
Communes of Morbihan
Prefectures in France
Port cities and towns on the French Atlantic coast
Gallia Lugdunensis